The United States Olympic team trials in swimming are held before every Summer Olympic Games to select the participants for the US Olympic swimming team. The event is overseen by the United States Olympic Committee and run by USA Swimming.

The first Olympic trials was held in 1920 in Alameda, California, to select swimmers for the 1920 Summer Olympics in Antwerp, Belgium. The men's and women's trials have been held separately six times.

Venues

See also
Swimming at the Summer Olympics

References

External links 
USA Swimming Olympic trials page

Swimming competitions in the United States
Swimming
Recurring sporting events established in 1920